Series are subdivisions of rock layers based on the age of the rock  and formally defined by international conventions of the geological timescale. A series is therefore a sequence of strata defining a chronostratigraphic unit. Series are subdivisions of systems and are themselves divided into stages.

Series is a term defining a unit of rock layers formed during a certain interval of time (a chronostratigraphic unit); it is equivalent (but not synonymous) to the term geological epoch (see epoch criteria) which defines the interval of time itself, although the two words are sometimes confused in informal literature.

Series in the geological timescale

The geological timescale has all systems in the Phanerozoic eonothem subdivided into series. Some of these have their own names, in other cases a system is simply divided into a Lower, Middle and Upper series. The Cretaceous system is for example divided into the Upper Cretaceous and Lower Cretaceous series; while the Carboniferous system is divided in the Pennsylvanian and Mississippian series. In 2008, the International Commission on Stratigraphy had not yet named all four series of the Cambrian. Currently series are limited to the Phanerozoic, but the ICS has stated its intention of subdividing the three systems of the Neoproterozoic (Ediacaran, Cryogenian and Tonian) into stages too.

Systems and lithostratigraphy
Systems can include many lithostratigraphic units (for example formations, beds, members, etc.) of differing rock types that were being laid down in different environments at the same time. In the same way, a lithostratigraphic unit can include a number of systems or parts of them.

See also
Chronostratigraphy

References

Chronostratigraphy
.
Geochronology
Geologic time scales
Geology terminology
Geological units